The flat-tailed day gecko (Phelsuma serraticauda) is a diurnal gecko lives in eastern Madagascar. It is endangered due to illegal collection for the international pet trade. It typically inhabits rainforests and dwells on trees. The flat-tailed day gecko feeds on insects and nectar.

Description
This lizard can reach an average total length of about 13 cm whereas females are slightly smaller. Some males may even reach a length of 15 cm. The body colour is dark green or yellowish green. Remarkable is the broad, flattened tail with serrated edges. On the lower back three red tear-shaped markings dots are present. On the neck, which may be bluish, two longitudinal yellow stripes are present. On the snout and head, there are three transversal red bars.

Distribution
This species occurs on the east coast of Madagascar. It is only known from the region 12 km north of Toamasina.

Habitat

Phelsuma serraticauda is largely restricted to coconut palms yet can also be found on banana trees.

Diet
These day geckos feed on various insects and other invertebrates. They also like to lick soft, sweet fruit, pollen and nectar.

Behaviour
This species lives in groups with one male and up to five females. Amongst the females, there is a well-developed dominance hierarchy. Juveniles are tolerated up to a certain size.

Reproduction
The females lay up to 4 pairs of eggs per year. At a temperature of 28 °C, the young will hatch after approximately 53–58 days. The juveniles are typically 40 mm in length.

Captivity
The flat-tailed day gecko is endangered due to illegal collection for the international pet trade.

These animals should be housed in pairs or small groups and need a large, well planted terrarium. The temperature should be between 25 and 28 °C. The humidity should be maintained between 75 and 90%. In captivity, these animals can be fed with crickets,  wax moth larvae, fruit flies, mealworms and houseflies.

References

 Henkel, F.-W. and W. Schmidt (1995) Amphibien und Reptilien Madagaskars, der Maskarenen, Seychellen und Komoren. Ulmer Stuttgart. 
 McKeown, Sean (1993) The general care and maintenance of day geckos. Advanced Vivarium Systems, Lakeside CA.

serraticauda
Species endangered by the pet trade
Species endangered by habitat fragmentation
Reptiles described in 1963
Reptiles as pets